Andrew Dias (born May 19, 1998) is a Canadian soccer player.

Career

Club 
Dias made two appearances for Toronto FC II during the 2015 USL season, after being called up from the TFC Academy. He came off the bench to make his debut during a 3–2 win over FC Montreal on September 5, 2015, before making his first start for the club in a 2–0 defeat to Rochester Rhinos on September 24, 2015. Dias remains with Toronto FC II on loan from the academy ahead of the 2016 USL season.

International 
Dias was one of nine Toronto FC players named in Canada's squad for the CONCACAF Under-17 Championship. After being listed three times as an unused substitute, he made his U17 debut in a 3–1 victory over Saint Lucia on March 9, 2015. He remained as an unused substitute for Canada's final two games of the tournament before losing in the play-off round.

Career statistics

References 

1998 births
Living people
Canadian soccer players
Toronto FC players
Toronto FC II players
Association football defenders
League1 Ontario players
USL Championship players
Soccer players from Toronto
Canada men's youth international soccer players
North Toronto Nitros players